As a member of FIFA and UEFA, the Montenegro national football team has been playing official matches since March 2007. Montenegro plays in the qualifiers for the FIFA World Cup and UEFA European Championship, as well as partaking in the UEFA Nations League. Apart from that, the team participates in friendly matches.

List of matches

2007

2008

2009

2010

2011

2012

2013

2014

2015

2016

2017

2018

2019

2020

2021

2022

2023

Montenegro versus other countries

See also
Montenegro national football team
Montenegro national football team records and statistics
Sport in Montenegro

References

External links
 Montenegro national football team results
 Montenegro national football team results

Results
Association football in Montenegro lists